Cattle King is a 1963 American Western film directed by Tay Garnett. It stars Robert Taylor and Robert Loggia. It was also known by the alternative title of Guns of Wyoming in some countries.

Plot
A range war is building in Wyoming. Caught on opposite sides are Sam Brassfield, who builds fences to protect his grass land, and Clay Mathews, a cattle baron determined to keep an open range.

Both men argue their case before the cattlemen's association to President Chester A. Arthur, who happens to be in Cheyenne for a visit. A hired gun of Mathews picks a fight with Brassfield's top man, Johnny Quatro, in a saloon, then vows revenge after Brassfield intervenes.

Brassfield proposes marriage to Sharleen Travers, who runs a neighboring ranch with her brother Harry. At first the spineless Harry sides with Mathews, but after a scolding from his sister, he apologizes to Brassfield. A while thereafter, the hired gun Bodine shoots and wounds the unarmed Harry, then kills Sharleen in cold blood.

Another rancher mistakenly blames Brassfield for a raid that Matthews ordered. He changes sides after overhearing Brassfield speak on his behalf to the President. In a final showdown, Brassfield urges Mathews to keep the dispute between themselves, then outdraws Mathews in a gunfight. Bodine also pulls a gun, but Quatro shoots him down.

Cast
 Robert Taylor as Sam Brassfield
 Robert Loggia as Johnny Quatro
 Joan Caulfield as Sharleen Travers
 Robert Middleton as Clay Mathews
 Larry Gates as President Chester A. Arthur
 Malcolm Atterbury as Abe Clevenger
 William Windom as Harry Travers
 Virginia Christine as Ruth Winters
 Richard Devon as Vince Bodine
 Ray Teal as Ed Winters
 Bob Ivers as Webb Carter
 Maggie Pierce as June Carter
 Woodrow Parfrey as Stafford
 Richard Tretter as Hobie Renton
 John Mitchum as Tex

Box office
According to MGM records, the film earned $435,000 in the US and Canada and $650,000 elsewhere resulting in a gain of $20,000.

See also
 List of American films of 1963

References

External links
 
 
 
 

1963 films
1963 Western (genre) films
American Western (genre) films
1960s English-language films
Films directed by Tay Garnett
Films about farmers
Films about cattle
Films set on farms
Films set in the 1880s
Films set in Wyoming
Metro-Goldwyn-Mayer films
Cultural depictions of Chester A. Arthur
Films scored by Paul Sawtell
1960s American films